Andrzej Pasek (born 13 March 1974) is a Polish equestrian. He competed in two events at the 2004 Summer Olympics.

References

External links
 

1974 births
Living people
Polish male equestrians
Olympic equestrians of Poland
Equestrians at the 2004 Summer Olympics
People from Trzebiatów